Phaenomonas is a genus of eels in the snake eel family Ophichthidae.

Species
There are currently three recognized species in this genus:

 Phaenomonas cooperae G. Palmer, 1970 (Short-maned sand-eel)
 Phaenomonas longissima (Cadenat & Marchal, 1963) (Short-maned Sand-Eel)
 Phaenomonas pinnata G. S. Myers & Wade, 1941 (Elastic eel)

References

Ophichthidae